We Will Bury You, quote by Soviet Premier Nikita Khruschchev

We Will Bury You may also refer to:

Comics 
 We Will Bury You is a 2010 zombie comic book miniseries by Brea Grant and Zane Grant.

Non Fiction Books 
We Will Bury You: The Soviet Plan for the Subversion of the West by the Highest Ranking Communist Ever to Defect, a 1963 book on the Cold War by Czechoslovakian Major General and defector Jan Šejna 
We Will Bury You: Studies in Left Wing Subversion Today, a 1970 book by British journalist and intelligence expect Brian Crozier

See Also 

 Ich bin ein Berliner - Phase from a 1963 speech by John F. Kennedy in West Berlin.
 Mr. Gorbachev, tear down this wall - Phase from a 1987 speech by Ronald Regan in West Berlin.